George Arthur Wearring (June 5, 1928 – March 3, 2013) was a Canadian basketball player who competed in the 1952 Summer Olympics. He was born in London, Ontario.

Career 
He was part of the Canadian basketball team, which was eliminated after the group stage in the 1952 tournament. He played all six matches. Wearring was on the University of Western Ontario basketball team.

References

External links
profile
George Wearring's obituary

1928 births
2013 deaths
Basketball people from Ontario
Basketball players at the 1952 Summer Olympics
Canadian men's basketball players
Olympic basketball players of Canada
Sportspeople from London, Ontario
Western Mustangs basketball players